This is a bibliography of the American rock group Kiss. Throughout their career they released numerous books and printed works celebrating their career of around four decades. Apart from the official Kiss books, there have been countless unofficial biographies and pictorials. Listed are all official printed works from the Kiss catalogue and the official biographies and autobiographies of various members of the group.

Official

Kiss: The Real Story
by Peggy Tomarkin 
(ASIN: 0440048346)

The Real Story was the first official Kiss biography first published in April 1980 and was reprinted in 1981 by the Dutch Kiss fan club in a limited format. It is 112 pages.

Kisstory

()

Kisstory was heralded as “the Kiss bible” and covers the band's history up until the mid-1990s. The first edition was published in March 1995 and was reprinted a year later for the original line-up reunion. It is a hardcover book with 440 pages, cased in a cardboard hardcover slipcase.

Kisstory II: Toys, Games and Girls
by Susan McEowen (Designer), Kisstory Limited Staff
()

Kisstory II was published in March 2000 and follows on from where the previous book left off and details the original line-up's reunion and subsequent tours and the band's Psycho Circus album. It also gives a semi-detailed history and guide to Kiss merchandise. Like the first Kisstory book it is a hardcover book, housed in a hardcover slipcase and is 435 pages.

Kiss: The Early Years
by Gene Simmons, Paul Stanley, Waring Abbott
()

Kiss: The Early Years is an official pictorial book consisting of previously unseen photos from Kiss’ early period during the early 1970s up until the Alive! album, with photos exclusively taken by the one of the group's original photographers, Waring Abbott. It was published in paperback in November 2002 and is 207 pages.

Behind the Mask: The Official Authorized Biography
by Ken Sharp and David Leaf
()

The first full-length Kiss biography to be authorized by the band and includes interviews with members past and present, as well as archive material and previously unseen photographs. The first edition was published in November 2003 and is 576 pages.

Kiss Army Worldwide!: The Ultimate Fanzine Phenomenon
compiled by Ken Sharp, Gene Simmons and Paul Stanley

Kiss Army Worldwide! is a collection of Kiss fanzines printed and published by Kiss Army chapters from all over the world. It was published on October 1, 2009 and is 240 pages.

Kiss Kompendium
by Gene Simmons & Paul Stanley

The Kiss Kompendium is a hardcover collection of Kiss comics. It compiles both issues of the Marvel Comics Super Special, the Marvel Kissnation comic, the comic printed especially for 1995 book, Kisstory, along with the Psycho Circus and Dark Horse comic series’. The book also features exclusive Kiss photos taken backstage at the band's then current concert tour in support of their Sonic Boom album. As well as commentary by band members, Gene Simmons and Paul Stanley. It was published in December 2009 and is 1280 pages.

Monster
by Various

Monster is a pictorial book measuring 3 x 2.5 feet and has a choice of ten countries flags for the cover, as well as, a Kiss “Monster” logo edition and a Kiss Army logo edition. Every issue is signed by each current band members, Gene Simmons, Paul Stanley, Tommy Thayer, and Eric Singer and is limited to 1000 copies. It was published July 3, 2012 for First Light Publishing and costs an estimated US$4,200 to purchase.

Nothin' to Lose: The Making of KISS (1972-1975)
by Ken Sharp, Gene Simmons & Paul Stanley

Published on September 10, 2013 Nothin' to Lose chronicles the band's turbulent early years, from their initial struggles, to worldwide fame and success.

References

External links
Kiss Fanzine.com (Norway)

Kiss
Kiss (band)
Kiss